Notable alumni of Northern Arizona University:

Academia 

 Harvey Butchart – author and professor known for hiking exploits near Grand Canyon
 Raymond R. Rogers – geology professor
 Diana Gabaldon – author of the Outlander series

Actors and television 
 Rutanya Alda – actress
 Quentin Oliver Lee - stage actor, widely known for the title role in Andrew Lloyd Webber's The Phantom of the Opera
 Joe Anglim – Survivor contestant
 Seamus Dever – actor in Castle
 Marjean Holden – actress

Artists
 R.C. Gorman – Native American artist
 R. Carlos Nakai – Native American performing artist and composer
 Ryan Singer – artist
 Mary Antonia Wood – artist
 Ray Manley – photographer

Government and military 

 Robin Braun – United States Navy rear admiral
 Raul Hector Castro – 14th Governor of Arizona; U.S. Ambassador
 Jay R. Vargas – United States Marine Corps Medal of Honor recipient

Science
 David Mangelsdorf – pharmacologist
 Michael Reeves  – YouTuber and roboticist

Sports
 Greg Adams – National Hockey League
 Travis Brown – National Football League, quarterback
 Dave Cahill – National Football League, defensive tackle
 Darren Carrington – National Football League, safety
 Allan Clark – National Football League, running back
 Shawn Collins – National Football League, wide receiver
 Casey Frank – American-New Zealand professional basketball player
 George Grantham – Major League Baseball, infielder
 Michael Haynes – National Football League, wide receiver
 Mike Jankowski – skiing and snowboarding coach
 Maya Kalle-Bentzur – Israeli Olympic runner and long jumper
 David Lang – National Football League, running back
 Jeff Lewis – National Football League, wide receiver
 Goran Lingmerth – National Football League, kicker
 Mark Lomas – National Football League, defensive lineman
 Lopez Lomong – South Sudanese-born track and field athlete and Olympian
 Pete Mandley – National Football League, wide receiver
 Derek Mason – current defensive coordinator for Auburn Tigers
 Todd McMillon – National Football League, cornerback
 Mike Mercer – National Football League
 Rex Mirich – National Football League, defensive tackle
 Lee Mulleneaux – National Football League
 Keith O'Neil – National Football League linebacker, Super Bowl XLI champion with Indianapolis Colts
 Josh Oppenheimer – Israeli-American professional basketball coach, and former professional basketball player
 Frank Pollack – offensive tackle, San Francisco 49ers
 John Rade – National Football League, linebacker
 Andre Spencer (1964–2020) – basketball player
 Brian Stewart – National Football League and college coach
 Rayna Stewart – National Football League, safety
 Rusty Tillman – National Football League, linebacker

Other
 Kayla Mueller – Islamic State hostage and aid worker
 Lisa Olson – sports journalist

References

 
Northern Arizona Alumni